TNF receptor-associated factor 5 is a protein that in humans is encoded by the TRAF5 gene.

Function 

The scaffold protein encoded by this gene is a member of the tumor necrosis factor receptor-associated factor (TRAF) protein family and contains a meprin and TRAF homology (MATH) domain, a RING-type zinc finger, and two TRAF-type zinc fingers. TRAF proteins are associated with, and mediate signal transduction from members of the TNF receptor superfamily. This protein is one of the components of a multiple protein complex which binds to tumor necrosis factor (TNF) receptor cytoplasmic domains and mediates TNF-induced activation. Alternate transcriptional splice variants have been characterized.

Interactions 

TRAF5 has been shown to interact with:

 ASK1, 
 CD134, 
 CD30, 
 CD40, 
 RANK 
 TNFRSF13B,  and
 TNFRSF14.

References

Further reading